This is a list of well-known Mormon dissidents or other members of the Church of Jesus Christ of Latter-day Saints (LDS Church) who have either been excommunicated or have resigned from the church – as well as of individuals no longer self-identifying as LDS and those inactive individuals who are on record as not believing and/or not participating in the church.  While the church doesn't regularly provide information about excommunication or resignation, those listed here have made such information public. In a very few cases, the list below may include former adherents of other Latter Day Saint movement denominations who have ceased identifying as members of the Church, as well.

See: List of Latter-day Saints for current members of the LDS Church.

Former and inactive members

Artists, Actors, and Entertainment Figures
 Kevin Abstract, rapper, singer-songwriter, director, and founding member of Brockhampton
 Amy Adams, five-time Academy Award-nominated actress known for roles in Enchanted, Doubt, The Fighter

 Christina Aguilera is a singer who was raised in an LDS home by parents who met at the church-owned university BYU and married in the Washington D.C. Temple, though, Aguilera has not self-identified as Mormon.
 David Archuleta, American pop singer
 Hal Ashby, director of New Hollywood films such as Shampoo and Being There
 Tal Bachman, son of Randy Bachman (Bachman-Turner Overdrive) and Canadian musician known for his 1999 hit song, "She's So High"
 Dustin Lance Black, screenwriter and producer, 2009 Oscar for Best Screenplay for Milk
 Gutzon Borglum, sculptor most noted for the heads of U.S. presidents on Mount Rushmore
 Win Butler, frontman for the band Arcade Fire
Ed Catmull, animation pioneer and president of Pixar and Walt Disney Animation
 Johnny Cunningham, brother of Phil, and member of Silly Wizard
 Phil Cunningham, Scottish folk musician, member of Silly Wizard
 Cytherea, American pornographic actress who popularized female ejaculation
 Brian Keith Dalton, the creator, producer and main character of Mr Deity. He coined the term "Formon" for "former Mormon" in 1996.
Jack Dempsey, world heavyweight boxing champion
 Eliza Dushku, actress known for roles in Buffy the Vampire Slayer, Tru Calling, Dollhouse
 Richard Dutcher, independent filmmaker and actor known for films God's Army, God's Army 2: States of Grace, Brigham City
 Aaron Eckhart, Golden Globe Award-nominated actor known for roles in Thank You for Smoking, The Dark Knight, Erin Brockovich
 Mindy Gledhill, singer songwriter
 Tyler Glenn, lead singer for the American rock band Neon Trees
 Ryan Gosling, Academy Award-nominated actor known for roles in Half Nelson, The Notebook, Drive
 Leigh Harline, Hollywood composer, known most notably for "When You Wish Upon a Star"
 Annette Haven, American former pornographic actress
 Katherine Heigl, American actress
 Jessica Holmes, Canadian comedian
 Julianne Hough, dancer, actress, singer, songwriter 
 Neil LaBute, playwright
 Bert McCracken, of the rock band The Used
 David Petruschin is a drag queen with the stage name "Raven" and was raised Mormon.
 Sue-Ann Post, Australian comedian who wrote The Confessions of an Unrepentant Lesbian Ex-Mormon
 Kevin Rahm, actor known for his television roles as Kyle McCarty on Judging Amy, Lee McDermott on Desperate Housewives, and Ted Chaough on Mad Men
Dan Reynolds (singer), singer for rock band Imagine Dragons
 Wayne Sermon, guitarist for rock band Imagine Dragons
 Will Swenson, actor and singer
 Brendon Urie, of rock band Panic! at the Disco
 Janet Varney, American actress and podcaster
 Paul Walker, actor known for role in The Fast and the Furious film series
 Alex Winters, BBC children's TV presenter
La Monte Young, extremely influential avant-garde composer of minimalist and drone music
 Mahonri Young, sculptor and grandson of Brigham Young
 Warren Zevon, singer/songwriter

Business Figures
 Bruce Bastian served as a church missionary to Italy, graduated from BYU, and married in a church temple before coming out. He and a BYU professor developed and co-founded WordPerfect software for word processing.
 Belladonna, American pornographic actress
Wilford Brimley, actor known for Cocoon, The Firm, Quaker Oats commercials, and Liberty Medical "diabeetus" meme
 Nolan Bushnell, founder of Atari and Chuck E. Cheese
 George S. Eccles, CEO of First Security Bank and philanthropist
 Marriner Eccles, CEO of First Security Bank and Chairman of the Federal Reserve System
 Jim Jannard, sunglasses designer and founder of Oakley, Inc. 
 Bryan Johnson (entrepreneur), Founder of Braintree, Venmo and Kernel
Wilson McCarthy, head of the Denver & Rio Grande Railroad
 Kip Thorne, theoretical physicist, co-founder of the LIGO gravitational wave project, and Nobel Laureate

Sports Figures
 Merlin Olsen, NFL star turned TV star 
 Mark Schultz (wrestler), Gold medal winning wrestler.
 Benji Schwimmer, the winner of the 2006 So You Think You Can Dance show.

Scholars
 Wayne C. Booth, American literary critic and professor of English
 Paul D. Boyer, biochemist, Nobel Laureate
 William Jasper Kerr, president of Oregon Agricultural College (now Oregon State University) from 1907-1932
Spencer L. Kimball, dean of the University of Utah law school, son of Mormon prophet Spencer W. Kimball

Politics
 Rocky Anderson, 33rd mayor of Salt Lake City, Utah, 2000–2008
 Jacinda Ardern, Prime Minister New Zealand, 2017-
 Frank J. Cannon, U.S. Senator from Utah
 Jim Dabakis is an Utah state senator married to his husband Stephen Justeson. Formerly enrolled at BYU in 1971, he left after his mission and he came out at as gay at 23.
 James "Bo" Gritz, controversial former United States Army Special Forces officer
 Abby Huntsman, political commentator and great-granddaughter of Apostle David B. Haight
 Jon Huntsman Jr., former Utah governor, former U.S. Ambassador to Singapore, China, and Russia, and grandson of Apostle David B. Haight
 Sonia Johnson is a prominent radical feminist and supporter of the Equal Rights Amendment.

 Kate Kendell is a lesbian lawyer from Utah who currently serves as the Executive Director of the National Center for Lesbian Rights. She graduated from the University of Utah in 1988 and became the first staff attorney for the American Civil Liberties Union of Utah. Kate and her partner, Sandy Holmes, live in San Francisco with their two children, as well as Kendall's daughter from a previous marriage.
 Alfred W. McCune, railroad builder, mine operator, and politician
 Sterling McMurrin, U.S. Commissioner of Education in the Kennedy administration, provost of the University of Utah, and philosopher
 Culbert Olson, twenty-ninth governor of California
 Esther Peterson, Assistant Secretary of Labor in the Kennedy administration and consumer advocate
 Pro-Life (born Marvin Richardson), politician known for his opposition to abortion and for changing his name to reflect his views
Calvin Rampton, three-term Utah governor
 Marco Rubio, U.S. Senator from Florida
 Brent Scowcroft, National Security Adviser to multiple U.S. Presidents 
 Carrie Sheffield, writer and political analyst
 Kyrsten Sinema, U.S. Senator from Arizona
 Misty Snow is an American politician and transgender woman who grew up Mormon in Salt Lake City. She won over 1/4th of Utah votes for state senator, as the first transgender nominee for a major party to the nation's Senate.
 Obert C. Tanner, founder of the O.C. Tanner Company, philanthropist, and philosophy professor
 Morris Udall, Arizona Congressman and presidential candidate
 Stewart Udall, Secretary of the Interior in the Kennedy and Johnson administrations, Arizona congressman, environmental activist, attorney, and author
 Tom Udall, U.S. Senator for New Mexico
 Jenny Wilson (politician), Salt Lake County Mayor
 Ted Wilson (mayor), former three-term Salt Lake City mayor
 Carl Wimmer, member of the Utah House of Representatives from 2006-2012

Miscellaneous
 Heather Armstrong, blogger, dooce.com
 Martha Nibley Beck, daughter of Mormon apologist Hugh Nibley and author of bestseller Leaving the Saints: How I Lost the Mormons and Found My Faith.
 Steve Benson, cartoonist and grandson of LDS Church president Ezra Taft Benson
 Patrick Califia is a writer on the topic of sexuality and identifies as a bisexual trans man.
 Brian Evenson, American writer of literary and popular fiction
Vardis Fisher, "Lost Generation" author of Children of God and the Testament of Man 
Laci Green is a bisexual sex educator and online video creator for Seeker and MTV. In 2016, Time named her one of the 30 most influential people on the Internet.
 Johnny Harris, American journalist and YouTuber
 Carolyn Tanner Irish, bishop in the Episcopal Church in the United States of America
 Walter Kirn, literary editor of GQ
 Grant H. Palmer, lifelong employee of the Church Educational System and author of An Insider's View of Mormon Origins (2003)
 Levi Peterson, author of The Backslider
 Arthur Pratt, tenth child of LDS Apostle Orson Pratt and Sarah Pratt, deputy U.S. marshal
 Sarah M. Pratt, outspoken critic of plural marriage, first wife of Apostle Orson Pratt
 Jeremy Runnells, published an 84-page open letter with questions about some of his concerns with the LDS Church.
 Cara Santa Maria, American science correspondent and podcaster
 William Shunn, science fiction writer
Mike Simpson, U.S. Congressman from Idaho 
 Julia Murdock Smith, adopted daughter of Joseph Smith
 Virginia Sorensen, "Lost Generation" novelist of A Little Lower Than The Angels
 Jerald and Sandra Tanner, writers, researchers and critics of the LDS Church
 Lynne Kanavel Whitesides, feminist
 Lynn Wilder, wrote an ex-Mormon memoir

Excommunicated members 

 Lavina Fielding Anderson, scholar, writer, editor, and feminist
 Martha Beck, sociologist, life coach, best-selling author, and columnist for O, The Oprah Magazine
 Arthur Gary Bishop, serial killer and child molester
 Jason Derek Brown, 489th fugitive to be placed on the FBI Ten Most Wanted list
 Ted Bundy convicted serial killer and rapist
 John Dehlin, founder of the Mormon Stories podcast
 James J. Hamula, former LDS general authority
 Mark Hofmann, double murderer and an expert forger; "considered by forensic experts to be the best forger yet caught"
 Helmuth Hübener, opponent of the Third Reich; posthumously reinstated by the LDS Church in 1946
 Sonia Johnson, feminist and a Peace and Freedom Party presidential nominee
 Kate Kelly, lawyer and feminist, advocate of woman holding the priesthood
 Ogden Kraut, independent Mormon fundamentalist author
 Deborah Laake, wrote an ex-Mormon memoir
 George P. Lee, former LDS general authority, convicted child molester
 Bob Lonsberry, writer and talk radio host, expelled for "bad conduct" prior to 2001, has since rejoined
 David Charles Manners, British writer and charity co-founder
 Richard McCoy, Jr., hijacker of a United Airliner passenger jet for ransom in 1972
 Brent Lee Metcalfe, LDS Historian
 Teresa Nielsen Hayden, essayist and science fiction editor, lapsed at time of excommunication
 Orson Pratt, Jr., first son of Apostle Orson Pratt
 D. Michael Quinn, LDS historian
 Denver Snuffer, Utah lawyer and author of books on LDS doctrine
 Simon Southerton, molecular biologist lapsed at time of excommunication
 Paul Toscano, attorney and author
 Dan Vogel, LDS Historian
 James Walker, president of Watchman Fellowship (watchman.org)
 George D. Watt, secretary to Brigham Young and compiler of the Journal of Discourses
 Ann Eliza Young, ex-wife of Brigham Young

See also
 Criticism of the Church of Jesus Christ of Latter-day Saints
 Culture of The Church of Jesus Christ of Latter-day Saints
 Ex-Mormon
 Exmormon Foundation
 Groups within Mormonism
 Irreligion
 List of former atheists and agnostics
 List of former Christians
 List of former Protestants
 List of former Roman Catholics
 List of former Muslims
 Mormon spectrums of orthodoxy and practice
 Non-denominational
 Spiritual but not religious

References

Latter Day Saint movement lists
People excommunicated by the Church of Jesus Christ of Latter-day Saints